Pa Sak may refer to:
Pa Sak River in Thailand
The name of several villages and tambons in Thailand:
Pa Sak, Chiang Rai
Pa Sak, Lamphun
Pa Sak, Phrae
Pa Sak, Phayao

See also
Pasak (disambiguation)